The Gold Medal of the Royal Astronomical Society is the highest award given by the Royal Astronomical Society (RAS). The RAS Council have "complete freedom as to the grounds on which it is awarded" and it can be awarded for any reason. Past awards have been given for "outstanding personal researches in the fields of astronomy and geophysics" as well as general contributions to astronomy and geophysics "that may be made through leadership in research programmes, through education and through scientific administration". It has been awarded both for research that has taken a lifetime (it has most frequently been given to recognise an extraordinary lifetime achievement), and for specific pieces of research.

History
The RAS was founded in 1820 and the first Gold Medals were awarded in 1824. Silver medals were also awarded in 1824 and 1827, but that practice was quickly abandoned, instead the RAS established other awards.

In the early years, more than one medal was often awarded in a year, but by 1833 only one medal was being awarded per year.  This caused a problem when Neptune was discovered in 1846, because many felt an award should jointly be made to John Couch Adams and Urbain Le Verrier.  A controversy arose and no award was made in 1847. The controversy was resolved by giving 12 "testimonial" awards in 1848 to various people including Adams and Le Verrier, and in 1849 awards resumed, with a limit of one per year. Adams and Le Verrier did not get their gold medals until 1866 and 1868, respectively. Adams, who was then President of the RAS, presented Le Verrier with the medal.

In some years, particularly early on, the RAS sometimes decided that there were no suitable nominations and so did not award the gold medal. There are therefore 17 years without an award, the most recent being 1942 (on that occasion due to the disruption of the Second World War). One medal per year was the usual practise, although two medals were awarded in both 1867 and 1886. To ensure balance in research areas, in 1964 the award was expanded to two medals per year, one in astronomy (including astrophysics, cosmology etc.) and one in geophysics (including planetary science, tectonics etc.), which remains the current system. All recipients are listed below, along with the years when no award was made.

The first woman to receive the Gold Medal was Caroline Herschel in 1828. No other woman received the award until Vera Rubin in 1996. Margaret and Geoffrey Burbidge were jointly awarded the 2005 Gold Medal in astronomy, the first joint award since 1886.

The medal features an image of the 40-foot telescope constructed by Sir William Herschel, the first President of the RAS.

Recipients

See also

 List of astronomy awards
 List of geophysics awards

References

Astronomy prizes
Astronomy in the United Kingdom
British science and technology awards
Awards established in 1824
1824 establishments in the United Kingdom
Royal Astronomical Society
Geophysics awards